Hampton is an unincorporated community in Deschutes County, Oregon, United States.

History
Hampton was named for the Hampton Buttes, which in turn were named for Joe Hampton, who moved to the area from Eugene in the 1870s. Hampton post office was established in 1911 and closed in 1953, after one intermission. In 1940 Hampton had a population of 41. As of 2003, Hampton, also known as Hampton Station, had a gas station and a restaurant.  By 2010, the gas station had closed. As of at least October 22, 2020 it is confirmed to be open again.

Transportation
In the 21st century, Hampton is a stop on the Eastern POINT intercity bus line between Bend and Ontario. It makes one stop per day in each direction.

References

External links
Historic image of Hampton from Salem Public Library

Unincorporated communities in Deschutes County, Oregon
1911 establishments in Oregon
Unincorporated communities in Oregon